Gherome Eric Angeles Ejercito (born March 19, 1977) is a Filipino former professional basketball player. He last played for the Rain or Shine Elasto Painters in the Philippine Basketball Association. He also first played from the Pampanga Dragons in the Metropolitan Basketball Association, then won the championship team in 1998 and later played for the San Juan Knights in 1999. 

He played for the rookie team Bureau of Customs Transformers in the UNTV Cup Season 5. He was hailed Best Player of the Game twice, with one of them because of his half-court buzzer beater game-winning shot against the House of Representatives Solons. His team reached the semifinals, ending up in fourth place and donating P500,000 to their beneficiary Caritas Manila, Inc.

References

1977 births
Living people
Barako Bull Energy Boosters players
Barako Bull Energy players
Gherome
Gherome
Filipino men's basketball players
Philippine Basketball Association All-Stars
Point guards
Rain or Shine Elasto Painters players
San Juan Knights players
Shooting guards
TNT Tropang Giga players
Adamson Soaring Falcons basketball players